Norfolk Street may refer to:

Norfolk Street, Fremantle, Australia
Norfolk Street, Strand, London, UK
Norfolk Street station, Newark, New Jersey, US
Norfolk Street Historic District, Cambridge, Massachusetts, US